Tamsin Alice Mather  (born 1976) is a British Professor of Earth Sciences at the Department of Earth Sciences, University of Oxford and a Fellow of University College, Oxford. She studies volcanic processes and their impacts on the Earth's environment and has appeared on the television and radio.

Education 
Mather was born in Bristol on 15 December 1976, the daughter of William Mather and Felicity Mather. She was educated at St John's College, Cambridge, where she was awarded a Master of Science degree in 1999, a Master of Philosophy (MPhil) degree in 2000 and a Doctor of Philosophy degree in 2004. As an undergraduate she studied the Natural Sciences Tripos before switching to the History and Philosophy of Science for her MPhil (in the same MPhil class as Helen Macdonald and Katherine Angel). She spent a year working abroad before returning to science for her PhD which was completed in the Department of Earth Sciences and investigated the chemistry of volcanic plumes in the troposphere. Her PhD involved working in Chile, Nicaragua and Italy.

Career and research
Mather studies volcanic behaviour working to understand volcanoes as natural hazards, planetary scale processes and natural resources. Mather is a Professor of Earth Sciences at the University of Oxford and a fellow of University College, Oxford.

She is part of the Centre for the Observation and Modeling of Earthquakes, Volcanoes and Tectonics (COMET) project, which is a “collaborative centre for understanding tectonic and volcanic processes and hazards though the integrated application of Earth Observation (EO) data, ground-based measurements, and geophysical models”.

Other current projects include: the Natural Environment Research Council (NERC) funded RiftVolc project, researching past and current volcanism and volcanic hazards in the main Ethiopian rift, the Natural Environment Research Council (NERC) funded Volatiles, Geodynamics & Solid Earth Controls on the Habitable Planet programme researching deep Earth influences in the long-term evolution of the Earth  and the European Research Council funded project Revealing hidden volcanic triggers for global environmental change events in Earth’s geological past using mercury (Hg).

Past projects include: the Natural Environment Research Council (NERC) and Economic and Social Research Council (ESRC) Strengthening Resilience in Volcanic Areas collaboration, (STREVA) which looked to establish a risk assessment framework for volcanoes.

She is interested in the role of volcanism in planetary scale processes. Her research has identified that volcanic vents perform nitrogen fixation and make it available to plants. 
Mather's research investigates volcanic plumes, the effects of volcanic emissions and aerosols on the environment, and the structure and stability of volcanoes. She has also studied the emissions from Buncefield fire at the Buncefield oil depot in 2005 and is interested in the mercury cycle, as well as other biogeochemical cycles.

Mather has led or collaborated on work studying volcanoes around the world, both in situ and using remote sensing data from ground or satellite based platforms. Volcanoes Mather has studied include Bárðarbunga, Hekla, and Eyjafjallajökull in Iceland, the Santorini caldera in Greece, the Villarica, Lascar, Chaitén and Calbuco volcanoes in Chile, Masaya Volcano in Nicaragua (where she was held up at gunpoint), Mount Etna in Italy, Galeras in Colombia, the Santiaguito lava dome complex in Guatemala, and the Great Rift Valley, Ethiopia.

Mather's research has been funded by the Natural Environment Research Council (NERC), the Science and Technology Facilities Council (STFC), the European Research Council and the Royal Society.

In 2005 she served as a Parliamentary Office of Science and Technology (POST) Fellow producing a POSTnote note on Carbon capture and storage, she served as co-editor-in-chief of Earth and Planetary Science Letters 2014-2019, served on the board of directors of the Geochemical Society 2017-2019, on the Natural Environment Research Council Science Board/Committee 2017-2021 and on the International Continental Scientific Drilling Program Science Advisory Group 2019-2022.

Media and outreach
In 2016 Mather appeared on the BBC World Service discussing volcanoes and earthquakes. Mather was interviewed on BBC Radio 4's The Life Scientific in 2017. She has taken part in Pint of Science, lectured at the Royal Institution and appeared on podcasts. She was a guest on The Infinite Monkey Cage alongside Jo Brand and Clive Oppenheimer in February 2018 and spoke at New Scientist Live in 2018.

Awards and honours
2022: Appointed a geochemistry fellow by the European Association of Geochemistry
2021: Elected a Member of the Academia Europaea (MAE)
2018: Awarded the Rosalind Franklin Award of the Royal Society.
2010: Awarded the Philip Leverhulme Prize by the Leverhulme Trust.
2008: Awarded the national L'Oréal-UNESCO For Women in Science Award.  
2005: Awarded a Dorothy Hodgkin Research Fellowship by the Royal Society, which funded the study of volatile emissions from volcanoes.

References

Living people
1976 births
People from Bristol
Alumni of St John's College, Cambridge
British geologists
Members of Academia Europaea
British volcanologists
Volcanologists
Fellows of University College, Oxford